Kildorrery is a village in north County Cork, Ireland. It lies at the crossroads of the N73 road from Mallow to Mitchelstown and the R512 from Kilmallock to Fermoy.

This hilltop village has views to the east of the Galtee Mountains and Knockmealdown Mountains with Slievenamon in the distance. To the north the Ballyhouras – the Limerick road is flanked by two mountains, Castlegale and Carrigeenamronety (Carraigín na mBróinte). To the south, across the Blackwater Valley are the Nagle mountains, and to the west towards County Kerry the Paps are sometimes visible.

The village hosts an annual food fair in which local families (of various nationalities) allow people to sample the cuisine of their native countries.

The town has been the subject of a number of environmental concerns in the recent past including proposals for a municipal landfill at Ballyguyroe in 2001, and applications to An Bord Pleanála in 2004 and 2008 to place a landfill in the Ballyhoura Mountains near the village. Kildorrery is part of the Cork East Dáil constituency.

Economy
The local economy is based on agriculture. There is a large horticultural business, a national haulage firm and several small family run pubs and shops.

Education
The school on Fermoy Road was constructed in 1977 replacing the two-roomed "Old School" formerly known as Scart National School built at the height of the Great Famine in 1847.

See also
 List of towns and villages in Ireland
 Bowen's Court, a former nearby country house

References

Towns and villages in County Cork
Civil parishes of County Cork